The 2013 Africa Cup was the thirteenth edition of the Africa Cup, an annual international rugby union tournament for African nations organised by the Confederation of African Rugby (CAR). This tournament, as well as the 2012 and 2014 editions of it, served as the qualifiers for the 2015 Rugby World Cup.

Changes from last season

Changes from the 2012 Africa Cup:
 Division 2 was divided into a North and South tournaments
 A new Division 3 was added, divided into North and Central tournaments, however no games were ever played
  was promoted to Division 1A
  was relegated to Division 1B
  was promoted to Division 1B
  was relegated to Division 1C
  was relegated to Division 3 North, although the Division 3 games were never played
  will not take part, after withdrawing in 2012.
  will not take part, although they were scheduled to play host to Division 3 North.
  sent two teams the previous year, but will only be sending one in 2013.
 For the first time ever,  was to be taking part in the new Division 3 Central group, however none of the Division 3 games took place.

Division 1A

Division 1A was held between 10 and 14 July 2013, at the Mahamasina Municipal Stadium in Antananarivo, Madagascar.  The competing teams will be (pre-tournament IRB World Rankings in parentheses:
  (37)
  (44)
  (42)
  (31)

Due to losing the third place playoff, Uganda will be demoted to 2014 Africa Cup Division 1B, and was eliminated from 2015 Rugby World Cup qualifying.

Semi-finals

3rd Place Playoff

Final

Division 1B

Division 1B was held between 11 and 15 June 2013, at the Iba Mar Diop Stadium in Dakar, Senegal. The competing teams were (pre-tournament IRB World Rankings in parentheses):
  (78)
  (23)
  (47)
  (43)

Namibia won the tournament, and will be promoted to Division 1A in the 2014 Africa Cup.

Semi-finals

3rd Place Playoff

Final

Division 1C

Division 1C was held between 22 and 29 June 2013, at the Ecole Supérieur des Travaux Publics - Institut National Polytechnique Félix Houphouët-Boigny Sud in Yamoussoukro, Ivory Coast.

Ivory Coast won the tournament, and will be promoted to Division 1B in the 2014 Africa Cup.

Numbers in parentheses indicate pre-tournament IRB Ranking.  NR=not ranked

Match Schedule 
All times in UTC

Division 2

Starting in 2013, Division 2 was divided into North and South Groups.

North

The North Group tournament was held in Niamey, Niger between 3 and 10 June 2013. Due to winning, Niger qualified for the Division 1C tournament which took place three weeks following.

Match Schedule

South

The South Group tournament was held in Rwanda on 22 June 2013. In addition to Rwanda and Burundi, it was supposed to also feature Swaziland and Tanzania, however they were unable to attend.

Rather than a full tournament, a single game was held at Stade Amahoro, with Rwanda defeating Burundi with a score of 22 - 0.

Division 3

Starting in 2013, there is now at third division, split into North and Central groups.

Central

The Central Group tournament was to be held in Democratic Republic of the Congo between 26 and 31 August 2013. However, 26 August came and went with no information about fixtures, and none of the games were played.

Teams:

North

The North Group tournament was to be held in Egypt between 10 and 13 October 2013. However, no games were scheduled by October 8, and no news about rescheduling was ever released.

Teams:

See also
Africa Cup
2015 Rugby World Cup – Africa qualification

References

2013
2013 rugby union tournaments for national teams
2013 in African rugby union